Marian Gold (born Hartwig Schierbaum; 26 May 1954) is a German singer-songwriter who gained fame as the lead singer of the German synth-pop recording act Alphaville, but also has recorded as a solo artist. He is known for his tenor multi-octave vocal range.

Biography

Early life
Born in Herford, West Germany, Gold became part of the Berlin art collective the Nelson Community, where he formed the band Chinchilla Green in the late 1970s, which also included future Alphaville colleague Bernhard Lloyd.

Alphaville
In 1982, he joined Lloyd and Frank Mertens in the band Forever Young, which soon became Alphaville. He sang lead vocals on Alphaville's 1980s pop singles, including "Forever Young", "Big in Japan", "Sounds Like a Melody", "Dance with Me" and "Jerusalem".

As of 2022, he is the last remaining original member of the band, whose latest album "Eternally Yours" was released in 2022.

Solo

Gold's first solo album, So Long Celeste, was released in 1992. Included on the album were cover versions of "The Shape of Things to Come" (originally by the Headboys) and "One Step Behind You" (by Furniture).

A second solo album, United, followed in 1996.

Personal life
In the late 1980s, Gold lived in Münster with his then wife Manuela.

Gold has seven children by four different women.

References

External links

Moonbase - Official Alphaville Web Site

Living people
1954 births
People from Herford
German tenors
German male singers
German new wave musicians
Synth-pop new wave musicians
Male new wave singers
English-language singers from Germany
Alphaville (band) members